Émile Edmond Jean Peynot (November 22, 1850 – December 12, 1932) was a prominent French artist sculptor and medallist.

Bio
Peynot was born in Villeneuve-sur-Yonne, Burgundy. He became well known following his Grand Prize at the Prix de Rome sculpture competition in 1880, and a left a legacy of numerous monuments and reliefs in France as well as Argentina and Ecuador. He died in Paris in 1932.

Famous works
 Marianne, Place Carnot, Lyon.
 Monument to Henri Schneider, Le Creusot.
 Monument to François-Louis Français, Plombières-les-Bains, Vosges.
 Marchand Tunisien ("Tunisian Mechant"), portraying an Arab merchant cleaning his weapon.
 La Aurora ("The Twilight"), Parque Centenario, Buenos Aires.
 Ofrenda Floral a Sarmiento ("Flowers for Sarmiento"), Palermo Rose Garden, Buenos Aires.
 La Lucha Eterna ("The Eternal Fight"), El Ejido park, Quito.
Francia a la Argentina A gift from the French government created for Argentina centenary in 1910; it depicts two female figures, representing both countries, an angel of prosperity “Gloria” and four smaller figures: Science, Industry, Agriculture and the Arts.

See also 
 Prix de Rome
 French art

References

1850 births
1932 deaths
People from Yonne
20th-century French sculptors
19th-century French sculptors
French male sculptors
19th-century French male artists